The A412 is a road in England between Slough and Watford. It was the main artery for this corridor and used to continue to St Albans prior to the construction of the M25. It provides interchange to the A4 in Slough, the A40/M40 at the Denham Roundabout, the M25 in Maple Cross, the A404 in Rickmansworth town centre, the A411 on a partially grade separated dual carriageway in Watford town centre, and the A41 in North Watford.

Route
Berkshire
Slough

Buckinghamshire
Iver Heath
Denham

Hertfordshire
Maple Cross
Rickmansworth
Croxley Green
Watford
North Watford
Garston

References 

Roads in England
Roads in Hertfordshire
Roads in Buckinghamshire
Roads in Berkshire
Streets in the London Borough of Hillingdon